The 1973–76 Balkan Cup was the 11th Balkan Cup football tournament. It was the first tournament played in a knockout system with semi-finals and finals. It was played between April 1973 and November 1976 between Turkey, Romania, Bulgaria and Greece. The tournament was won by Bulgaria over Romania via the away goal rule, the score being 3–3 in the two legs of the final. The top goalscorer was Cemil Turan from Turkey with 4 goals.

Bracket

Semi-finals 

|}

First leg

Second leg

Final 

|}

First leg

Second leg

Winner

Statistics

Goalscorers

References 

1973–76
1973–74 in European football
1974–75 in European football
1975–76 in European football
1973–74 in Bulgarian football
1974–75 in Bulgarian football
1975–76 in Bulgarian football
1973–74 in Romanian football
1974–75 in Romanian football
1975–76 in Romanian football
1973–74 in Greek football
1974–75 in Greek football
1975–76 in Greek football
1973–74 in Turkish football
1974–75 in Turkish football
1975–76 in Turkish football